Sphaeromyxa is a genus of cnidarians belonging to the family Sphaeromyxidae.

The species of this genus are found in Europe and Northern America.

Species

Species:

Sphaeromyxa arcuata 
Sphaeromyxa argentinensis 
Sphaeromyxa artedielli

References

Sphaeromyxidae